Perla Achával was an Argentine actress. She starred in the 1950 film Arroz con leche.

References

External links
 
 

Argentine film actresses
20th-century Argentine actresses
Possibly living people
Year of birth missing
Place of birth missing